The 1974 All-Atlantic Coast Conference football team consists of American football players chosen by the Atlantic Coast Sports Writers Association (ACS) as the best at each position in Atlantic Coast Conference ("ACC") during the 1974 NCAA Division I football season. 

The 1974 Maryland Terrapins football team won the 1974 ACC championship and led all other teams with six players selected as first-team players on the ACC team. Clemson and NC State each placed four players on the first team.

Two players were selected unanimously by all 123 voters: running back Stan Fritts of NC State and defensive tackle Randy White of Maryland. White broke the ACC career records for points and touchdowns. White  also won the 1974 Outland Trophy, played 14 seasons in the National Football League, and was inducted into the College and Pro Football Hall of Fames.

All-Atlantic Coast Conference selections

Offensive selections

Wide receivers
 Jimmy Jerome, North Carolina (ACS-1 [86])

Ends
 Bennie Cunningham, Clemson (ACS-1 [66])

Tackles
 Ken Peeples, Clemson (ACS-1 [94])
 Stan Rogers, Maryland (ACS-1 [93])

Guard
 Ken Huff, North Carolina (ACS-1 [107])
 Bob Blanchard, NC State (ACS-1 [73])

Center
 Justus Everett, NC State (ACS-1 [101])

Quarterback
 Chris Kupec, North Carolina (ACS-1 [54])
 Bob Avellini, Maryland (ACS-2 [39])

Backs
 Stan Fritts, NC State (ACS-1 [123])
 Louis Carter, Maryland (ACS-1 [109])
 James Betterson, North Carolina (ACS-1 [84])

Defensive selections

Linemen
 Randy White, Maryland (ACS-1 [123])
 Willie Anderson, Clemson (ACS-1 [56])
 Dennis Turner, Duke (ACS-1 [55])
 Ronnie Robinson, North Carolina (ACS-1 [49])

Linebackers
 Dick Ambrose, Virginia (ACS-1 [107])
 Keith Stoneback, Duke (ACS-1 [101])
 Harry Walters, Maryland (ACS-1 [90])

Defensive backs
 Bob Smith, Maryland (ACS-1 [90])
 Jeff Christopher, Duke (ACS-1 [78])
 Mike Devine, NC State (ACS-1 [78])
 Jimmy Ness, Clemson (ACS-1 [71])

Special teams

Kickers
 Steve Mike-Mayer, Maryland (ACS-1 [105])

Return specialist
 Troy Slade, Duke (ACS-1 [69])

Key
ACS = Atlantic Coast Sports Writers Association

See also
1974 College Football All-America Team

References

All-Atlantic Coast Conference football team
All-Atlantic Coast Conference football teams